United Nations Operation in Somalia II (UNOSOM II) was the second phase of the United Nations intervention in Somalia and took place from March 1993 until March 1995, following the outbreak of the Somali Civil War in 1991.

UNOSOM II carried on from the United States-controlled (UN-sanctioned) Unified Task Force (UNITAF). It had been active for a transition period when United Nations Operation in Somalia I (UNOSOM I) mission proved to be ineffectual. All three of these interventions were intended to establish a secure enough environment for humanitarian operations to be carried out.

Four months into its mandate, UNOSOM II would shift into a military campaign as it became embroiled in conflict, primarily against the Somali National Alliance led by Gen. Mohammed Farah Aidid. The infamous Battle of Mogadishu would take place during UNOSOM II, signifying the end of the hunt for Aidid and major operations in Somalia. The United Nations would pull out of Somalia one year later, marking the end of UNOSOM II.

Background

Following the failure of the monitoring mission created as UNOSOM by the United Nations, the United States offered to lead a substantial intervention force, made up chiefly of American personnel.  This was accepted by the UN and made possible through United Nations Security Council Resolution 794, authorizing the use of "all necessary means to establish as soon as possible a secure environment for humanitarian relief operations in Somalia". The Security Council urged the Secretary-General and member states to make arrangements for "the unified command and control" of the military forces that would be involved.

On the evening of 4 December 1992, U.S. President George H. W. Bush addressed the nation, informing them that U.S. troops would be sent to Somalia. The U.S. contribution would be known as Operation Restore Hope, which joined a multinational force and became known as the United Task Force (UNITAF). The operations of UNOSOM I were suspended. UNITAF was authorized under Chapter VII of the United Nations Charter.

The United States intended UNITAF and U.S. control as a transitional action. The mission consisted of four phases. The first phase was the initial deployment of troops to provide secure harbor and airport sites in Mogadishu, from where the entire operation would be managed. Second was the expansion of the security zone to the surrounding regions of southern Somalia. Due to a more lenient environment than expected and the encouragement from NGOs (Non-governmental Organizations), UNITAF forces accomplished phase two a couple of weeks ahead of schedule. Third, the forces would expand the security zone into Kismayo and Bardera and maintain secure land routes for humanitarian operations throughout the security zone. The fourth and final phase consisted of the US handing over operations to the United Nations and withdrawing most of the UNITAF forces.

Expansion of mandate 
On 3 March 1993, the Secretary-General submitted to the Security Council his recommendations for effecting the transition from UNITAF to UNOSOM II. He noted that despite the size of the UNITAF mission, a secure environment was not yet established. There was still no effective functioning government or local security/police force. The Secretary-General concluded that, should the Security Council determine that the time had come for the transition from UNITAF to UNOSOM II, the latter should be endowed with enforcement powers under Chapter VII of the United Nations Charter to establish a secure environment throughout Somalia. UNOSOM II would therefore seek to complete the task begun by UNITAF. The new mandate would also empower UNOSOM II to assist in rebuilding their economic, political and social life, so as to recreate a Somali State. Most notably it would also mandate the disarmament of Somali militias.

The new UN-controlled mission, to be called UNOSOM II, was established by the Security Council in Resolution 814 (1993) on 26 March 1993. It did not formally take over operations in Somalia until UNITAF was dissolved on 4 May 1993.

In operation

A federalist government based on 18 autonomous regions was agreed upon by the leaders of Somalia's various armed factions. It was the objective of UNOSOM II to support this new system and initiate nation-building in Somalia. This included disarming the various factions,  helping the people to set up a representative government, and restoring infrastructure.

UNOSOM II had a strength of 28,000 personnel, including 22,000 troops and 8,000 logistic and civilian staff from Algeria, Australia, Austria, Bangladesh, Belgium, Botswana, Canada, Denmark, Egypt, Fiji, Finland, France, Germany, Greece, India, Indonesia, Ireland, Italy, Kuwait, Jordan, Malaysia, Morocco, Nepal, New Zealand, Nigeria, Norway, Pakistan, Philippines, Spain, South Korea, Romania, Saudi Arabia, Sweden, Switzerland, Tunisia, Turkey, the United Arab Emirates, the United Kingdom, the United States and Zimbabwe. The U.S. provided 1,167 troops for a Quick Reaction Force, which would remain under US operational control, and would be stationed on US Navy ships off the coast of Somalia (see Carrier Strike Group 6). This force would respond to emergency threats to UNOSOM II but only if US Central Command approved.

Growing hostilities between UNOSOM and the SNA 
Major disagreements between the UN and the Somali National Alliance began soon after the establishment of UNOSOM II, centering on the perceived true nature of the operations political mandate. In May 1993, relations between the SNA and UNOSOM would rapidly deteriorate following two significant events.

Kismayo Incident 
While the Addis Ababa conference was in progress in March, pro-Siad Barre forces - vehemently opposed to Aidid, began to infiltrate weapons into the Somali port city of Kismayo, which was under the control of UNITAF forces at the time. Gen. Hersi Morgan, commander of the pro-Barre forces, drove out the Somali National Alliance forces under the command of Col. Omar Jess.

On 7 May, three days after UNOSOM II took control of Kismayo from UNITAF, the SNA made an attempt to retake the city. During the assault the Belgian peacekeepers stationed in the town intervened, considering the assault to take Kismayo an attack on their positions and consequently repelled the SNA forces. The fall of Kismayo to Gen. Morgan infuriated the Somali National Alliance. To the SNA the incident was viewed as blatant U.N. partiality, as UNITAF had failed to prevent Morgan from seizing the city and UNOSOM had then fought SNA forces who had tried to retake it.

Galkayo Conference 
In May, Gen. Aidid and Col. Abdullahi Yusuf of the Somali Salvation Democratic Front would agree to hold a peace conference for the central region of Somalia. Gen. Aidid had initiated the consultations with Col. Yusuf and consequently viewed himself as the convener and chair of the conference who would be responsible for establishing the agenda. He would invite Special Representative of the Secretary-General for Somalia, Adm. Johnathan Howe to open the conference.

Aidid sought to focus the conference only on Somalia's central regions, and soon ran into conflict with UNOSOM. The UN sought to broaden participation of the conference to other regions of Somalia and suspicious of Aidid, sought to replace his chairmanship over the conference with former Somali President Abdullah Osman, who hated Aidid and had publicly called for his arrest.

The differences between Aidid and the UN proved to be to great, and the conference proceeded without the United Nations participation. The contention between the Somali National alliance and UNOSOM from that point forward would begin to manifest in anti-UNOSOM propaganda broadcast from SNA controlled Radio Mogadishu.

June 5th 1993 attack on the Pakistanis and hunt for Aidid

Radio Mogadishu 
Radio Mogadishu was a highly popular broadcast station with the residents of the city, and was a vital piece of SNA infrastructure that had been captured following a vicious battle with Ali Mahdi's forces. Following the Kismayo and Galkayo incidents that station began to air anti-UNOSOM propaganda, incensing high ranking UN personnel. It was feared that the broadcasts would shift the attitudes of the Somali public towards the United Nations operation, leading UNOSOM officials to resolve to close the station. In mid-May, the Pakistani contingent was asked to draw up a plan to shut down the station. The Pakistanis did not possess the technical expertise required for such an operation and requested that the US supply experts.

Importantly, Radio Mogadishu had also been an Authorized Weapons Store Site (AWSS), subject to UNOSOM inspection. It was decided the American special forces technicians would accompany a Pakistani weapons inspection team to the site in order to determine how to disable the station. Gen. Aidid and the upper echelons of the Somali National Alliance, had been made aware of the discussions to seize or destroy the station.

5 June 1993 inspection 
According to the 1994 United Nations Inquiry: Opinions differ, even among UNOSOM officials, on whether the weapons inspections of 5 June 1993 was genuine or was merely a cover-up for reconnaissance and subsequent seizure of Radio Mogadishu.On June 5, a Pakistani force was sent to investigate an arms depot belonging to a Somali warlord vying for the Presidency, Mohamed Farrah Aidid. When the Pakistani force arrived, they encountered angry Somali protesters. Twenty-four Pakistani soldiers inspecting weapons as part of the expanded UN mandate were killed when "forces believed to be associated with Aidid allegedly launched a fatal attack on peacekeeping forces."

UNOSOM hunt for Aidid begins 
The UN responded the next day with Resolution 837, reaffirming that the secretary-general was authorized to "take all necessary measures against those responsible for the armed attacks and to establish the effective authority of UNOSOM II throughout Somalia." This was essentially equivalent to declaring war on Aidid, a declaration that would lead to numerous confrontations between UNOSOM II personnel and Aidid's militia. Though UNOSOM II had much fewer war-fighting resources than UNITAF, but it was much more ambitious and aggressive. On 12 June 1993 U.S. troops began a military offensive around Mogadishu. On 17 June, a $25,000 warrant was issued by Admiral Jonathan Howe for information leading to the arrest of Aidid, but he was never captured.

The hunt for Aidid characterised much of the UNOSOM II intervention. The increasing tempo of military operations carried out in Mogadishu began to cause civilian casualties and affected the relationship between the foreign troops and the Somali people. The UN troops were portrayed as foreign interlopers, particularly after incidents of civilian casualties caused by wholesale firing into crowds by peace keepers.

Abdi House Raid and the shift to combat operations 

On the 12th of July, a house where a meeting of clan elders was taking place was attacked by US AH-1 Cobra helicopters in what became known to the Somalis as Bloody Monday.

As the Americans became more insular, the warlords began to reassert control of many Mogadishu districts. With each failure to apprehend Aidid, the militias grew more bold. Serious rifts between nations contributing to UNOSOM II also began to develop, with Italy in particular being a major critic of the American methods.

Task Force Ranger deployed to find Aidid 

Somali militias began targeting peacekeepers, causing further casualties. On 8 August, Aidid's militia detonated a remote controlled bomb against a U.S. military vehicle, first killed four American soldiers and then, two weeks later, injured seven more. In response, President Bill Clinton approved the proposal to deploy a special task force composed of 400 US Army Rangers and Delta-force Commandos.

This unit, named Task Force Ranger, consisted of 160 elite US troops. They flew to Mogadishu and began a manhunt for Aidid in what became known as Operation Gothic Serpent. On October 3, 1993, Task Force Ranger raided a hotel in Mogadishu in which Aidid was thought to be hiding. What ensued was the longest, bloodiest and deadliest battle for US troops in Somalia. In what later became known as the Battle of Mogadishu, eighteen US soldiers were killed. Images of their dead bodies being dragged through the streets were broadcast on television stations all over the world, horrifying and infuriating the American public.

Fallout of the Battle of Mogadishu and the end of UNOSOM II

On October 7, 1993, in a nationwide television address, American President Clinton "effectively ended the US proactive policy in Somalia" and "called for the withdrawal of all US forces no later than March 31, 1994." Resolution 897, passed on February 4, nevertheless extended the UNOSOM mandate with one year to be concluded in March 1995.

US soldiers completely withdrew on March 3, 1994, 28 days earlier than expected. Other Western nations, including Italy, Belgium, France and Sweden, also decided to withdraw at this time. On November 4, 1994, after peacemaking efforts by the remaining 1,900 UNOSOM II troops failed, the United Nations Security Council (UNSC) voted unanimously to withdraw all forces in Resolution 954. Subsequently, on November 16, the UNSC authorized Resolution 955, placing new emphasis on peacemaking and reconstruction and returning to a less reactive role. The withdrawal of the remaining UN military and police troops from Somalia was completed on March 28, 1995, thereby ending UNOSOM II's mandate.

Various reconciliation talks were carried out over the next few months providing for a ceasefire, the disarmament of militias and a conference to appoint a new Government. However, preparations for the conference were repeatedly postponed and many faction leaders simply ignored the agreements at will.

Somalia participated in talks in December 1997 held in Cairo, Egypt, where Aidid and Mahdi, another Somali warlord, signed a "Declaration of Principles". The declaration promised to launch reconciliation conferences in February, 1998 and to prepare a transitional government charter.

Walter Clarke, who was Deputy Chief of Mission for the U.S. Embassy in Somalia during Operation Restore Hope, and Jeffrey Herbst, Associate Professor, Woodrow Wilson School, Princeton University, conclude that "The intervention in Somalia was not an abject failure; an estimated 100,000 lives were saved. But its mismanagement should be an object lesson for peacekeepers ... on other such missions."

Results of 1994 UN Inquiry 
The month following the Battle of Mogadishu, the United States urged the United Nations to establish the commission to determine who was responsible for the clashes between UNOSOM II peacekeepers and Aidid's SNA forces. A three-man UN inquiry commission headed by Matthew Nglube, former chief justice of Zambia, Gen. Emmanuel Erskine of Ghana and Gen. Gustav Hagglund of Finland was set up by the Security Council. On 30 November 1993 the commission landed in Mogadishu.

The report charged the Gen. Aidid with launching the 5 June 1993, attack which initiated the conflict between the SNA and UNOSOM. Notably, it also heavily criticized U.N. peacekeeping officials for embarking on a campaign of forceful disarmament of Somali factions, an effort that antagonized the Aidid's forces and sharpened tensions. The commission questioned the merit of the aggressive UNOSOM peacekeeping strategy and argued that the U.N. should not have abandoned its neutral role in Somalia.

The inquiry criticized the United States for operating under a separate military command and leading raids against Aidid that were not coordinated with UNOSOM officers. The commission condemned the use of American combat helicopters over the heavily populated neighborhoods of Mogadishu and criticized tactics as "incompatible with basic tenets of peacekeeping". Financial reparations for Somali civilians who became victims of the fighting were recommend by the report.

See also
 Mohamed Farrah Aidid
 Operation Deliverance
 Operation Provide Relief
 UNITAF
 UNOSOM I
 Checkpoint Pasta battle

Notes

Bibliography
 
 
 
 
  The story of David Morris, the driving force behind Morris Catering, who helped provide food for UNOSOM II while setting up fishing factories and maintaining close links with both major warlords: Mohamed Farrah Aideed and Mohammed Ali Mahdi.

External links
 United Nations Operation in Somalia II (UNOSOM II) (2003-2005) at the United Nations Archives Archived
 UN page of UNOSOM I Archived
 UN page of UNOSOM II Archived
 Overview of the US intervention in Somalia Archived

Operations involving American special forces
United Nations operations in Somalia
Somalia–United States relations
Battle of Mogadishu (1993)
Military operations involving India
Military operations involving New Zealand
Conflicts in 1993
Conflicts in 1994
Conflicts in 1995
Somali Civil War
1993 in Somalia
1994 in Somalia
1995 in Somalia
Military operations involving Saudi Arabia